Elections to the Uttar Pradesh Legislative Assembly were held in June 1977 to elect members of the 425 constituencies in Uttar Pradesh, India. The Janata Party won a majority of seats and Ram Naresh Yadav was appointed the Chief Minister of Uttar Pradesh. The number of constituencies was set as 425 by the recommendation of the Delimitation Commission of India.

Result

Elected members

Bypolls

See also
List of constituencies of the Uttar Pradesh Legislative Assembly
1977 elections in India
Ram Naresh Yadav ministry

References

Uttar Pradesh
State Assembly elections in Uttar Pradesh
1970s in Uttar Pradesh